Extinction chess is a chess variant invented by R. Wayne Schmittberger, editor of Games magazine, in 1985. Instead of checkmate as the winning condition, the object of the game is the elimination of all of a particular type of piece of the opponent. In other words, the objective is any of the following:

 capture all the opponent's kings;
 capture all the opponent's queens;
 capture all the opponent's rooks;
 capture all the opponent's bishops;
 capture all the opponent's knights;
 eliminate all of the opponent's pawns, by capturing or by promotion.

A promoted pawn is considered no longer a pawn. By the same token, if a player already has a queen, and promotes a pawn to another queen, then both queens would need to be captured to make them extinct.

The king is not a special piece in this game, and it is legal to promote a pawn to a king. It is also legal to castle when in check, or to castle through check. The other rules of castling are the same: the king and the rook must not have previously moved, and there must be no pieces in between. Similarly, rooks, bishops, and queens may freely cross attacked squares, even if they are the last of their type.

Both sides can suffer an extinction on the same move, if pawn promotion is involved. For example, White might have a last pawn on b7, and Black a last bishop on c8; then if White plays bxc8=Q, it causes the extinction of both the white pawns and the black bishops. In this case White is ruled to have won, as although both sides have fulfilled their winning conditions, it was a move by White that brought this situation about.

Notes

References

Bibliography

External links
Extinction chess by Hans Bodlaender and Antoine Fourrière, The Chess Variant Pages

Chess variants
1985 in chess
Board games introduced in 1985